Abdulnasser Al Obaidly  is a Qatari footballer who played as a midfielder for Qatar in the 2000 Asian Cup. He also played for Al Sadd.

External links

11v11 Profile

1972 births
Living people
Qatari footballers
Qatar international footballers
1992 AFC Asian Cup players
Footballers at the 1992 Summer Olympics
Olympic footballers of Qatar
2000 AFC Asian Cup players
Qatar Stars League players
Al Sadd SC players
Footballers at the 1998 Asian Games
Association football midfielders
Asian Games competitors for Qatar